Michael Jacob Kok (born 19 September 1991) is a Dutch retired basketball player. He formerly played for Rotterdam Basketbal 2 before joining the first team of the club in 2012. In 2015, Kok was selected for the U24 DBL All-Star Game. He retired in April 2020 after the 2019–20 season was ended early due to the COVID-19 pandemic.

Since 2022, Kok is an assistant coach with Feyenoord.

References

External links
 Michael Kok on RealGM

1991 births
Living people
Dutch men's basketball players
Feyenoord Basketball players
Dutch Basketball League players
Shooting guards